The following elections occurred in the year 1844.

North America

United States
 1844 New York state election
 1844 United States House of Representatives elections
 1844 United States presidential election
 1844 United States Senate elections

See also
 :Category:1844 elections

1844
Elections